Tregurrian (meaning Coryan's farm) is a hamlet 2 miles north-northeast of Newquay, on the north coast of Cornwall, England, United Kingdom.

The beach at Watergate Bay was formerly known as Tregurrian beach.

References

External links

 

Hamlets in Cornwall